Ernst Reitermaier (26 December 1918 – 4 May 1993) was an Austrian footballer and manager who played as a forward and made one appearance for the Germany national team.

Career
Reitermaier was able to represent Germany internationally following the Anschluss. He earned his first and only cap on 27 August 1939 in a friendly against Slovakia. The away match, which was played in Bratislava, finished as a 0–2 loss.

Personal life
Reitermaier died on 4 May 1993 at the age of 74.

Career statistics

International

References

External links
 
 
 
 
 

1918 births
1993 deaths
Footballers from Vienna
Austrian footballers
German footballers
Germany international footballers
Association football forwards
SK Vorwärts Steyr players
Austrian Football Bundesliga players
Austrian football managers
BC Augsburg managers